Onyx.tv was a German music television channel operated by the French AB Groupe.

Unlike MTV and VIVA, it had a reputation for less mainstream but alternative music such as punk subculture, electronic music or trip hop.

History
The broadcast began on 6 January 1996 under the name Onyx Music Television. On 15 September 2004, the French owner AB Groupe replaced the channel with the documentation channel terranova.

References

External links
 

Defunct television channels in Germany
Television channels and stations established in 1996
Television channels and stations disestablished in 2004
1996 establishments in Germany
2004 disestablishments in Germany
German-language television stations
Mediawan Thematics
Mass media in Cologne